The Hamlin School (also known as Hamlin School) is a private day school for girls in Kindergarten through eighth grade. It is the oldest nonsectarian, independent, day school for girls in the Western United States. Its school campus is located at 2120 Broadway, San Francisco, near Pacific Heights.

History

In April 1896 Sarah Dix Hamlin purchased the Van Ness Seminary School located at 1849 Jackson Street, San Francisco. In 1898, the school was renamed Miss Hamlin's School for Girls. In 1907, Hamlin moved to a mansion located at 2230 Pacific Avenue in San Francisco. 

On August 25, 1923, the Hamlin school founder, Sarah Dix Hamlin died after a short illness. Her sister, Catherine "Kate" Hamlin operated the Hamlin School after Sarah's death. In 1927, Corenelia M. Stanwood became the new principal of the school.

In 1928, Hamlin moved to its present location, a three-story Italian Baroque Revival mansion at 2120 Broadway in San Francisco. The mansion was built in 1901 by James Leary Flood. In 1946, Edith A. Mereen supervised the school until 1958. In June 1857, the school was established as a nonprofit corporation and a board of directors was formed. 

In 1961, a new classroom building was constructed on Vallejo Street that was named McKinne Hall with the main building on 2120 Broadway as Stanwood Hall. In 1971, Hamlin hosted boarders and became coeducational in grades 9-12 until the high school closed in 1975. In 2013, Hamlin celebrated the 150th anniversary of the Hamlin School.

Extracurricular activities

Athletics

Hamlin fields varsity teams in basketball, volleyball, cross country, running, soccer, track and field, among others. The rock climbing program is for 4-8 students. 

Arts

Hamlin offers courses in both the fine and performing arts including levels of visual art, and digital art. As well as a theater program with a musical performed by the graduating 8th grade class every year.

Chorus
Hamlin offers a large and joyful chorus program. Hamlin has both a Gold chorus and red chorus with the gold chorus being composed of 6th-8th graders and the red chorus being made up of 4th-5th graders.

Academic program

The Lower School offers Kindergarten through Grade 4. Curriculum includes language arts, social studies, science and engineering, mathematics, art, health and wellness, music, physical education and Spanish language.   

The Middle School is from Grade 5 through 8. Teacher/student ratio is 1:7. The curriculum expands courses of the Lower School with elective courses offered in drama, dance, yearbook, computer science and music. Student social events include culture club, community service, literary magazine and student government.

Hamlin's mission statement:

Notable graduates

 Janet Louise Choynski Fleishhacker ('28), married to  Mortimer Fleishhacker
 Marilyn Duke (attended, 1930s), American singer
 Katherine Feinstein ('75), attorney and judge; daughter of Dianne Feinstein
 Katharine Bossart ('85), entrepreneur, scientist
 Jennifer Dulski ('85), president and COO of Change.org
 Zoe Grimaldi ('08), organizer for Elizabeth Warren's 2020 presidential race
 Ivy Getty ('09), heiress, daughter of John Gilbert Getty

See also
List of high schools in California

External links
The Hamlin School official website

References

 

Educational institutions established in 1896
Private middle schools in California
Private elementary schools in California
San Francisco
1896 establishments in California